Babak Ghorbani (19 March 1989 – 16 November 2014) was an Iranian wrestler. In 2011 he was banned from competing for two years for doping, in 2012 he was charged in a murder, and in 2014 he committed suicide in prison.

Career
He won gold medal at 2010 Asian Games in Guangzhou.

In 2011, Ghorbani was banned from participation in FILA events for two years due to use of anabolic steroids. As a result, he was unable to compete in the 2012 Olympics.

Death
In 2012, he was in a fight during a hunting trip in a mountainous area of Kermanshah, and was charged with murder for shooting a man to death. He committed suicide in Dizelabad prison in Kermanshah on November 16, 2014, by ingesting an aluminum phosphide caplet used for fumigation.

References

1989 births
2014 deaths
Asian Games gold medalists for Iran
Asian Games medalists in wrestling
Murder in Iran
Wrestlers at the 2010 Asian Games
Doping cases in wrestling
Iranian sportspeople in doping cases
Iranian people who died in prison custody
Prisoners who died in Iranian detention
People who committed suicide in prison custody
Suicides in Iran
Iranian male sport wrestlers
Medalists at the 2010 Asian Games
Sportspeople from Kermanshah  
2012 murders in Iran
2014 murders in Iran
2014 suicides
Asian Wrestling Championships medalists